Hieronimus is a surname. Notable people with the surname include: 

Carl Hieronimus Gustmeyer (1701–1756), Danish merchant
Nicolas Hieronimus (born 1964), French businessman
Robert Richard Hieronimus (born 1943), American educator, artist, author, and activist